Liam Hayes is an Irish former sportsperson. He played Gaelic football for his local club Skryne and was a senior member of the Meath county team in the 1980s and 1990s. 

- 'Out of Our Skins' author, published 1992, recounting his time as a key member of the Meath Gaelic football team of the late 80s, early 90s and his upbringing in Skryne Co. Meath. The book also recounts the suicide of his older brother Gerard, in harrowing yet sensitive detail.

References

External links
Legends Interview Part 1
Legends Interview Part 2

Living people
Meath inter-county Gaelic footballers
The Sunday Press people
Winners of two All-Ireland medals (Gaelic football)
Year of birth missing (living people)
Place of birth missing (living people)